Colours is the third full-length album by American Christian rock band Resurrection Band, released in 1980.

Recording history 

Colours was Resurrection Band's first release for Christian label Light Records, which had up to this time been known as the primary record label for Andraé Crouch and similar gospel artists. Colours is also considered by some music critics to be one of the band's defining works.

Resurrection Band embraced a more radio-friendly rock and metal sound with this album, which is a mix of personal reflections on God's sovereignty and love ("Autograph," "Amazing" and the title track), the harsh life of the inner city ("N.Y.C.", "Beggar in the Alleyway"), and the need for personal redemption ("City Streets", "The Struggle"). "American Dream" is significant for being the first of many songs that Resurrection Band would write about the moral rot at the center of America's political and media culture, indicating a more progressive political worldview than most Christian musicians would sing about at the time.

The photos of the children inside the gatefold cover are those of Jesus People USA community members.

This is the only Resurrection Band album to feature no piano or keyboards whatsoever.

Track listing 

All songs by Glenn Kaiser unless otherwise noted
 "Autograph" – 4:03
 "Colours" – 4:58
 "N.Y.C." (Kaiser, Jim Denton) – 3:24
 "Hidden Man" – 2:48
 "Amazing" (Kaiser, Denton) – 2:22
 "American Dream" (Jon Trott, Kaiser, Denton) – 3:24
 "Benny & Sue" (Jon Trott, Kaiser, Denton, Stu Heiss) – 3:53
 "City Streets" (Kaiser, Trott, Denton) – 3:22
 "Beggar in the Alleyway" (Kaiser, Heiss) – 3:57
 "The Struggle" (Kaiser, Denton, Heiss) – 3:45

Personnel 

 Glenn Kaiser – vocals, guitars
 Wendi Kaiser – vocals
 Stu Heiss – guitars
 Jim Denton – bass guitar
 John Herrin – drums
 Resurrection Band – producer, mixing
 Phil Bonanno – engineer
 Tom Henson – engineer
 Roger Heiss – assistant engineer
 Mike Szarzynski – assistant engineer
 Phil Bonanno – mixing
 JPUSA Graphics – album cover concept
 Dick Randall – outside cover art
 Janet Cameron – inside art and layout
 Bob Cox – additional staff
 Lyda Price – additional staff
 Al Mross – additional staff
 Tom Fjelstad – photography

Resurrection Band albums
1980 albums